Taylor Washington (born August 16, 1993) is an American professional soccer player who plays for Nashville SC in Major League Soccer.

Career

Youth and college 
Washington was born in New York where he played youth soccer for Rye Country Day School. He played four years of college soccer, one year at Boston University in 2011, before moving to George Mason University in 2013. In 2013, with the Patriots, Washington won the Atlantic 10 Championship in Dayton, Ohio. Picking up 1st Team All-Conference honors and helping lead the team to the 2nd round of the NCAA Tournament. He was also named 2nd Team ALL-ECAC and 2nd Team All-VaSID.

While at college, Washington also appeared for Premier Development League side Worcester Hydra in 2012 and captaining the D.C. United U-23 in 2015.

Professional 
Following his senior season in 2015, Washington was invited to the 2016 MLS Player Combine, after initially being left off the combine list.

On January 14, 2016, Washington was selected 23rd overall in the 2016 MLS SuperDraft by Philadelphia Union.

He made his professional debut with Bethlehem Steel FC on March 25, 2016, starting in a 1–0 win over FC Montreal. Washington made one appearance for the Union in a friendly against English Premier League side Crystal Palace on July 13, 2016.

After the 2016 season, Taylor Washington's contract option with the Philadelphia Union was not renewed.

On December 20, 2016, Washington signed with the USL's Pittsburgh Riverhounds.

On December 7, 2017, Washington was announced as a new signing by Nashville SC ahead of their debut USL season.

Washington, after two years playing for the Nashville SC USL team was signed to an MLS contract with Nashville on November 22, 2019 along with three other USL players.

Career statistics

References

External links 
 
 George Mason profile
 Philadelphia Union profile
 
 

1993 births
Living people
American soccer players
Association football defenders
Philadelphia Union II players
Boston University Terriers men's soccer players
D.C. United U-23 players
George Mason Patriots men's soccer players
Nashville SC (2018–19) players
People from Somers, New York
Philadelphia Union draft picks
Philadelphia Union players
Pittsburgh Riverhounds SC players
Soccer players from New York (state)
Sportspeople from Westchester County, New York
USL Championship players
USL League Two players
Worcester Hydra players
Major League Soccer players